Peter Robert Gatenby (born 26 May 1949 in Launceston, Tasmania) is an Australian cricketer, who played for Tasmania. He was a right-handed batsman and wicket-keeper who represented the team in 1971.

See also
 List of Tasmanian representative cricketers

External links

1949 births
Living people
Australian cricketers
Tasmania cricketers
Cricketers from Launceston, Tasmania
Wicket-keepers